Chilperic I (c. 539 – September 584) was the king of Neustria (or Soissons) from 561 to his death. He was one of the sons of the Frankish king Clotaire I and Queen Aregund.

Life
Immediately after the death of his father in 561, he endeavoured to take possession of the whole kingdom, seized the treasure amassed in the royal town of Berny and entered Paris. His brothers, however, compelled him to divide the kingdom with them, and Soissons, together with Amiens, Arras, Cambrai, Thérouanne, Tournai, and Boulogne fell to Chilperic's share. His eldest brother Charibert received Paris, the second eldest brother Guntram received Burgundy with its capital at Orléans, and Sigebert received Austrasia. On the death of Charibert in 567, Chilperic's estates were augmented when the brothers divided Charibert's kingdom among themselves and agreed to share Paris.

Not long after his accession, however, he was at war with Sigebert, with whom he would long remain in a state of—at the very least—antipathy. Sigebert defeated him and marched to Soissons, where he defeated and imprisoned Chilperic's eldest son, Theudebert.  The war flared in 567, at the death of Charibert.  Chilperic immediately invaded Sigebert's new lands, but Sigebert defeated him.  Chilperic later allied with Guntram against Sigebert (573), but Guntram changed sides and Chilperic again lost the war.

When Sigebert married Brunhilda, daughter of the Visigothic sovereign in Spain (Athanagild), Chilperic also wished to make a brilliant marriage. He had already repudiated his first wife, Audovera, and had taken as his concubine a serving-woman called Fredegund. He accordingly dismissed Fredegund, and married Brunhilda's sister, Galswintha. But he soon tired of his new partner, and one morning Galswintha was found strangled in her bed. A few days afterwards Chilperic married Fredegund.

This murder was the cause of more long and bloody wars, interspersed with truces, between Chilperic and Sigebert. In 575, Sigebert was assassinated by Fredegund at the very moment when he had Chilperic at his mercy. Chilperic then made war with the protector of Sigebert's wife and son, Guntram.  Chilperic retrieved his position, took from Austrasia Tours and Poitiers and some places in Aquitaine, and fostered discord in the kingdom of the east during the minority of Childebert II.

In 578, Chilperic sent an army to fight the Breton ruler Waroch II of the Bro-Wened along the Vilaine. The Frankish army consisted of units from the Poitou, Touraine, Anjou, Maine, and Bayeux. The Baiocassenses (men from Bayeux) were Saxons and they in particular were routed by the Bretons. The armies fought for three days before Waroch submitted, did homage for Vannes, sent his son as a hostage, and agreed to pay an annual tribute. He subsequently broke his oath but Chilperic's dominion over the Bretons was relatively secure, as evidenced by Venantius Fortunatus's celebration of it in a poem.

Most of what is known of Chilperic comes from The History of the Franks by Gregory of Tours. Gregory detested Chilperic, calling him "the Nero and Herod of his time" (VI.46): he had provoked Gregory's wrath by wresting Tours from Austrasia, seizing ecclesiastical property, and appointing as bishops counts of the palace who were not clerics. Gregory also objected to Chilperic's attempts to teach a new doctrine of the Trinity, although some scholars dispute the extent to which Gregory disliked Chilperic.

Chilperic's reign in Neustria saw the introduction of the Byzantine punishment of eye-gouging. Yet, he was also a man of culture: he was a musician of some talent, and he wrote verse (modelled on that of Sedulius); he attempted to reform the Frankish alphabet; and he worked to reduce the worst effects of Salic law upon women. 

In September 584, while returning from a hunting expedition at his royal villa of Chelles, Chilperic was stabbed to death by an unknown assailant.  He was buried in the Saint Vincent Basilica of Paris, later incorporated in the Saint-Germain-des-Prés.

Family
Chilperic I's first marriage was to Audovera.  They had five children:

Theudebert (killed at battle 573).
Merovech (killed by a servant at his request in 577), married the widow Brunhilda (his aunt by marriage) and became his father's enemy
Clovis (assassinated by Fredegund in 580).
Basina (d. aft. 590), nun, led a revolt in the abbey of Poitiers
Childesinda (died young from dysentery)

His short second marriage to Galswintha produced no children.

His concubinage and subsequent marriage to Fredegund in about 568 produced six more legitimate offspring:

Rigunth (c. 569 – after 589), betrothed to Reccared but never married.
Chlodebert (c. 570/72 – 580), died young.
Samson (c. 573 – late 577), died young.
Dagobert (c. 579/80 – 580), died young.
Theuderic (c. 582 – 584), died young.
Chlothar II (before September 584 – 18 October 629), Chilperic's successor in Neustria, later sole king of the Franks.

Etymology
Chilperic's name in Frankish meant "powerful supporter", akin to German hilfreich "auxiliary" (cf. German Hilfe "help, aid" and reich "rich, orig. powerful")

Cultural references
An operetta on the subject, Chilpéric, was created by Hervé, first performed in 1864.

References

Sources
Sérésia, L'Eglise el l'Etat sous les rois francs au VI siècle (Ghent, 1888).
Dahmus, Joseph Henry. Seven Medieval Queens. 1972.
Halsall, Guy. "Nero and Herod? The death of Chilperic and Gregory of Tours’ writing of history," in The World of Gregory of Tours, ed. Kathleen Mitchell and Ian Wood (Leiden: Brill, 2002).

External links
     
History of the Franks: Books I-X At Medieval Sourcebook.

Merovingian kings
Frankish warriors
539 births
584 deaths
6th-century murdered monarchs
Burials at Saint-Germain-des-Prés (abbey)
6th-century Frankish kings
6th-century Frankish writers
6th-century poets
Deaths by blade weapons